Boeing Capital is a subsidiary of The Boeing Company, providing asset-based leasing and lending services. Boeing Capital is made up of two divisions, Aircraft Financial Services and Space & Defense Financial Services. It operates as a support unit for Boeing's main businesses.

History
Boeing Capital was incorporated in 1968 as McDonnell Douglas Finance, but this name was changed to Boeing Capital in 1997, when Boeing merged with the McDonnell Douglas Corporation.

The subsidiary is known as a worldwide provider of financial services, but primarily supports its parent corporation.

In September 2018, Boeing, Boeing Capital and insurance firm Marsh & McLennan were sued  for having stolen Xavian Insurance's actuarial analysis to create AFIC to replace the US-Exim Bank, stopped by then.

References

Financial services companies of the United States
Aircraft leasing companies
Boeing
Companies based in Renton, Washington
Financial services companies established in 1968
1968 establishments in Washington (state)
American corporate subsidiaries

1968 establishments in the United States